Khujjuttarā was one of the Buddha's foremost (Sanskrit: agra, Pali: agga) female lay disciples (Pali: upasika, savaka).

According to commentaries of the Pāli Canon, Khujjuttarā was a servant to one of the queens of King Udena of Kosambi named Samavati.  Since the queen was unable to go listen to the Buddha, she sent Khujjuttarā who went instead and became so adept that she was able to memorize the teachings and teach the queen and her 500 ladies in waiting.  From these discourses of the Buddha, Khujjuttarā, Queen Samavati and the queen's 500 ladies in waiting all obtained the fruit (Pali: phalla) of the first stage of Enlightenment ("stream-enterer," Pali: Sotapanna).

In the Pāli Canon itself, Khujjuttarā's repute is mentioned in the SN 17.24, entitled "Only Daughter," the Buddha states that faithful female lay disciples should urge their beloved daughters in the following manner:

"Dear, you should become like Khujjuttarā the lay follower and Velukandakiyā, Nanda's mother – for this is the standard and criterion for my female disciples who are lay followers, that is Khujjuttarā the lay follower and Velukandakiyā, Nanda's mother."

A similar reference is made in AN 4.18.6.  Additionally, in AN 1.14, verse 260, the Buddha declares Khujjuttarā to be his "most learned" female lay disciple.

The Khuddaka Nikaya book Itivuttaka, a collection of 112 short discourses, is attributed to Khujjuttara's recollection of Buddha's discourses.

See also 
 Savaka
 Sotapanna
 Khema
 Uppalavanna
 Vajira
 Velukandakiya
 Visakha
 Upasika
 Householder (Buddhism)

References

Bibliography 
Bodhi, Bhikkhu (trans.) (2000). The Connected Discourses of the Buddha: A Translation of the Samyutta Nikaya. Boston:Wisdom Publications. .
Ireland, John (trans. & intro.) (1999). Itivuttaka: The Buddha's Sayings (excerpts).  Article's "Introduction" is available on-line at http://www.accesstoinsight.org/tipitaka/kn/iti/iti.intro.irel.html#intro.
Thanissaro Bhikkhu (trans. & intro.) (2001). Itivuttaka: This Was Said by the Buddha. "Translator's Introduction" is available on-line at http://www.accesstoinsight.org/tipitaka/kn/iti/iti.intro.than.html#intro.

External links
"Relatives and Disciples of the Buddha: Royal Patrons," by Radhika Abeysekera.

Foremost disciples of Gautama Buddha
Buddhism and women